Philip McCallum (November 9, 1914 – March 6, 1995) was an American attorney who served as Administrator of the Small Business Administration from 1959 to 1961.

Born in Sault Ste. Marie, Michigan, McCallum moved to Ann Arbor, Michigan at an early age. He graduated from University of Michigan and from University of Michigan Law School. McCallum practiced law in Detroit, Michigan and then in Ann Arbor, Michigan.

References

1914 births
1995 deaths
People from Sault Ste. Marie, Michigan
People from Ann Arbor, Michigan
University of Michigan Law School alumni
Michigan lawyers
Administrators of the Small Business Administration
20th-century American lawyers